Danilo Nikolić may refer to:

 Danilo Nikolić (basketball) (born 1993), Montenegrin professional basketball player
 Danilo Nikolić (fencer), Serbian fencer in the 2012–13 Fencing World Cup
 Danilo Nikolić (footballer) (born 1983), Serbian footballer
 Danilo Nikolić (writer) (1926–2016), Serbian writer